Jean Trebek ( Currivan; September 8, 1963) is an American entrepreneur, philanthropist, and blogger.

Early life
Trebek was born on September 8, 1963, in Greenlawn, New York, as the second of three children in a Catholic family. She attended high school at Harborfields High School in Greenlawn and college at Pepperdine University in Los Angeles.

Career
Before moving to Los Angeles, Jean worked as a real estate project manager in Long Island, New York. She later pursued a part-time job as a bookkeeper.

She, along with Alison Martin, is a co-founder and blogger of "insidewink", a lighthearted lifestyle website on which she interviews various actors, spiritual leaders, and other famous personalities.

On August 19, 2021, prior to the start of Jeopardy! season 38 taping, she attended the dedication of the Sony Pictures Studios sound stage Studio 10 as "The Alex Trebek Stage" (named after her late husband), alongside her two children, Matthew and Emily, Trebek's adopted daughter, Nicky Trebek, and chairman and CEO of Sony Pictures Entertainment, Tony Vinciquerra.

Personal life
Jean was married to game show host and television personality Alex Trebek from 1990 until his death in 2020. She has two children, Matthew and Emily.

Filmography

Awards
On January 7, 2020, Trebek, along with her husband Alex, received the Fordham Founder's Award at Fordham University.

References

External links
 

Living people
1963 births
People from Greenlawn, New York
Businesspeople from New York (state)
Pepperdine University alumni